A crossword is a word puzzle.

Crossword may also refer to:

Arts and entertainment
 Crossword Puzzle, an album by The Partridge Family in 1973
 Crossword, an album by Helen Slater released in 2005
 Crossword Quiz, a Canadian game show which aired on CBC Television 1952–1953
 Crosswords DS, a 2008 video game by Nintendo
 Merv Griffin's Crosswords (commonly shortened to Crosswords), an American game show

Other uses
 Crossword Bookstores, a chain of bookstores in India

See also
 Crosswordese, a term for words found in crossword puzzles but seldom found in everyday conversation